Microctenopoma nigricans is a fish in the family Anabantidae found in the Lulua and Sankuru River drainages, tributaries of the Kasai River (Congo River system) in south-central Democratic Republic of Congo. 
It grows to 6.8 cm in standard length.

References

nigricans
Fish described in 1995
Endemic fauna of the Democratic Republic of the Congo